Mancell Flo Kirby ( 24 January 1897  – 29 February 1996) was an Australian harpsichordist, accompanist and music educator.

Early life and education 
Mancell Flo Kirby was born in Ballarat, Victoria on 24 January 1897 to Thomas Henry and Christiana Harriett Kirby (née Sinclair), who had married a year earlier. Her sister, Ellen Norine, was born three years later. The family moved to Melbourne, where her father, a commercial traveller, died late in 1900, leaving his widow £297. In 1908 Christiana married George Leighton Barrow, who brought up his two step-daughters after Christiana's death in 1911.

Kirby attended Canterbury State School and from 1912 to 1914 Fintona Presbyterian Girls' Grammar School in Camberwell. Her step-father married Mitta Nicholls. He died in 1922, leaving Mitta, a son Leighton and his two step-daughters Mancell and Norine.

Career 
On graduating from the Albert Street Conservatorium, East Melbourne with a Diploma in Music (1918), she was employed at Frensham, Mittagong as a piano teacher from 1919 to 1923.

References 

1897 births
1996 deaths
Australian harpsichordists
Australian accompanists
Australian music educators
Musicians from Melbourne
People educated at the Presbyterian Ladies' College, Melbourne